Governors State University (Governors State, GSU, or GOVST) is a public university in University Park, Illinois. GSU was founded in 1969. It is a public university offering degree programs at the undergraduate, master's, and doctoral levels. GSU has four colleges: the College of Arts and Sciences, the College of Business, the College of Education, and the College of Health and Human Services.

History 
Governors State University was established as a state-supported, upper-division institution of education on July 17, 1969, when Illinois Governor Richard B. Ogilvie signed into law House Bill 666. Originally scheduled to open to students in September 1973, the four-year planning period was reduced to two years and GSU received its first class of 500 students in September 1971. The university utilized warehouse space as the temporary home during the campus construction. Under the university's first president, William Engbretson, academic staff created an experimental educational environment focused on a collaborative learning environment between students and faculty in class sessions called modules that met for eight-week sessions. GSU was one of the original "Universities without Walls" as well as a university that did not offer grades, but competencies. In place of departments, it had interdisciplinary studies, and all professors held the rank of University Professor.

The university transitioned from the experimental curriculum to a more traditional model after Engbretson stepped down and Leo Goodman-Malamuth became GSU's second president. GSU developed academic divisions and departments, professors with rank (Assistant Professor, Associate Professor and Professor), and renovated the open space main building to classroom and office space. Structured classes in a trimester schedule, along with traditional transcripts were other changes during the era.

Following the original mandate to serve the underserved student populations such as veterans and nontraditional students with some college credits but no degree, the university developed telecourses in the 1980s. The classes were held in one of GSU's two television studios then were made available via tape or as programming on cable channels.

The first doctoral program was created in 2007 as a professional doctoral degree in physical therapy. GSU further developed other doctoral programs in nursing, occupational therapy, and education. In 2014, the state approved the university to expand curriculum for freshmen and sophomores.
Along with welcoming freshmen and sophomores to campus, the university opened its first on-campus residence hall, known as Prairie Place. The university created small class sizes for freshmen with courses taught by full-time faculty and individual sessions capped at 30 students.

Campus
It is within 30 minutes' drive from cities Kankakee and Joliet as well as northwestern Indiana. The main campus is located on a  wooded landscape with several lakes and natural trails.

Points of interest
The Family Development Center (FDC) provides university-quality programs for children and their parents. The Family Development Center will be the Model Early Education Center for the South Suburbs. GSU Family development center programs model the best practices in Early Childhood Education and draw extensively on the expertise of university faculty and staff in Early Childhood Education, Nursing, Communications Disorders (speech and hearing), Psychology and Counseling. University students in these programs at both the undergraduate and graduate levels are active participants in the Family Development Center. The Family Development Center has been nationally recognized for meeting the highest standards of early childhood education. The National Association for the Education of Young Children (NAEYC), the nation's leading professional organization working on behalf of young children, has awarded accreditation to the FDC.  
GSU is also home to the Center for Performing Arts, which draws entertainers and artists from around the world, as well as the local community. The Illinois Philharmonic Orchestra held monthly concerts on a fall through spring seasonal schedule throughout the 2007–2008 season.
Ethnographic Arts Collection, owned by the University Foundation of Governors State University, the beginning of the Ethnographic Collection dates nearly from the beginning of the University. Objects were generously donated by former faculty, students, and patrons for the purpose of direct instruction in art history classes and ethnic studies so that students might know first hand and be able to study and handle examples from various regions of the world. Initially, some examples were accepted that are not of prime "museum quality" but retained value as teaching objects. Yet over the years donations from generous collectors increasingly included objects of the highest quality and included multiple examples from certain ethnic contexts.

Sustainability

In 2008, GSU renovated several parking lots, replacing asphalt with permeable pavers—interlocking bricks that allow rainwater to seep down, trapping heavy metals and pollutants before they enter storm sewers. GSU is also home to one of the state's largest solar-thermal systems, which preheats water for the campus swimming pool and provides about one-third of the domestic hot water for the university's main building.

On October 21, 2010, Warren Ribley, director of the Illinois Department of Commerce and Economic Opportunity, announced a $153,000 grant for the 50-kilowatt wind turbine to be located on the University Park campus. With the installation of an on-campus wind turbine, Governors State University will continue reducing its greenhouse gas emissions, and move toward its goal of becoming Illinois’ "greenest" university. The wind turbine will give Governors State a clean, renewable source of energy, and also be incorporated into the university's academic programs.

On October 18, 2011, GSU held a groundbreaking ceremony for the beginning of the renovation of the university's science facilities. The $22.6 million, three year renovation project will create state-of-the-art education facilities while providing more than 130 construction jobs. In addition to the positive impact the renovation project will have on the region's economy, the building renovation will better equip GSU to educate students for regional jobs in healthcare, computer science, scientific, and mathematics research, and science and math education. During the renovation, crews will replace HVAC, electrical, plumbing, and lighting systems. Outmoded infrastructure and equipment will be replaced with modern facilities and equipment that will be energy-efficient and meet current codes and regulations. The renovated facilities will serve students and faculty in biology, chemistry, computer science, mathematics, nursing, communication disorders, occupational therapy, and physical therapy.

University Park station
University Park station opened in 1977, located adjacent to the GSU property along University Parkway.

Academics
GSU has the following colleges: Arts and Sciences, Business, Education, and Health and Human Services. The university as a whole is accredited by the Higher Learning Commission of the North Central Association of Colleges and Schools. The business programs are accredited by the Association to Advance Collegiate Schools of Business (AACSB) and the public administration program is accredited by the National Association of Schools of Public Affairs and Administration (NASPAA). The university is also a member of the Illinois Council of Baccalaureate and Higher Degree Programs.

Students can choose from 22 bachelor's, 27 graduate, and 4 doctoral degree programs. The university also offers 22 certificate programs. The most popular majors at Governors State University include: Accounting; Business Administration and Management; Liberal Arts; Biology; Criminal Justice; Computer Science; Information Technology; Elementary Education and Teaching; Psychology; Health Administration; and Social Work.
All of the university's programs have earned appropriate professional accreditation (if such accreditation exists), and are recognized by their respective professions. The university itself is accredited by The Higher Learning Commission. Eighty-five percent of the faculty members at this school hold a Ph.D. or the highest degree in their discipline, and most of the classes have fewer than 30 students.

Rankings

In 2012, U.S. News & World Report ranked three programs at the university:

 100th among the Best Occupational Therapy Schools
 154th among the best Physical Therapy Schools
 181st among best Speech-Language Pathology Schools

Awards 
Governors State University was awarded the 2015 American Council on Education/Fidelity Investments Award for Institutional Transformation. It is given to "colleges or universities which, in a period of great change in higher education, have responded to challenges in innovative and creative ways that allows the institution to thrive."

In 2014, GSU's Dual Degree Program was honored with the Student Success and College Completion Award by the American Association of State Colleges and Universities. In 2014, the National Resource Center for the First Year Experience and Students in Transition also recognized the Dual Degree Program at GSU with an award during its annual conference. The NRC launched the new award for "...institutions that have designed and implemented outstanding collaborative initiatives enhancing significant transitions during the undergraduate experience. Award recipients ... have demonstrated the effectiveness of the initiative in supporting student success, learning and development at a variety of transition points beyond the first college year and in responding to unique institutional needs."

The university also received the 2010 Governor's Sustainability Award for significant achievements in protecting the environment, helping sustain the future, and improving the economy. The awards were presented by the Illinois Sustainable Technology Center (ISTC) during a luncheon in Champaign.

Student body 
Fifty-one percent of Governors State's students are minorities and the average age of the students is 32.4 years old. Seventy percent of them are women.

Athletics

The Governors State (GSU) athletic teams are called the Jaguars. The university is a member of the National Association of Intercollegiate Athletics (NAIA), primarily competing the Chicagoland Collegiate Athletic Conference (CCAC) since the 2016–17 academic year. The Jaguars previously competed as an NAIA Independent within the Association of Independent Institutions (AII) during the 2015–16 school year.

GSU competes in nine intercollegiate varsity sports: Men's sports include basketball, cross country, golf and soccer; while women's sports include basketball, cross country, golf, soccer and volleyball.

History
The addition of the intercollegiate athletic competition in the fall of 2014 coincided with expansion of the university's academic offerings to a four-year curriculum and admission acceptance of GSU's first freshman class. GSU was accepted into membership by the NAIA for the 2015–16 school year. Initially competing as an NAIA Independent, the university gained membership in the CCAC starting in the 2016–17 school year. GSU's athletic program began with seven sports: men's and women's basketball, cross country and golf, and women's volleyball. The university also announced plans to grow the athletic department, adding baseball, softball and men's and women's soccer in the coming years. Governors State's expanded athletics to field varsity men's and women's soccer starting in the August 2019.

Notable people

Notable alumni
The university has more than 57,000 graduates who live in the United States and elsewhere.

 Muhal Richard Abrams, educator, administrator, composer, arranger, clarinetist, cellist, and jazz pianist in the free jazz medium
 DuShon Monique Brown, American actress, best known her roles on the television series Prison Break and Chicago Fire
 Jerry Butler, singer, songwriter and Cook County commissioner
 Curtis J. Crawford, computer systems engineer and businessman
 William Davis, member of the Illinois House of Representatives
 Jason Ervin, Chicago alderman
 Thomas Fuentes, former Assistant Director of the Federal Bureau of Investigation (FBI), and current Law Enforcement Analyst for CNN
 Susie Sadlowski Garza, Chicago alderman
 Debbie Halvorson, United States congresswoman and Illinois state senator
 Carl Hoecker, Inspector general of the U.S. Securities and Exchange Commission
 Richard F. Kelly, member of the Illinois House of Representatives and businessman
 Von Mansfield, a former defensive back in the National Football League
 Steve Miller, coach and athletic director at Kansas State University, executive at Nike, director of Professional Bowlers Association
 Bob Petty, American television reporter and news anchor for WLS-TV
 Josh Harms, member of the Illinois House of Representatives
 Reverend Albert Sampson, minister and civil rights activist who marched with Martin Luther King Jr.
 Herb Schumann, Cook County commissioner 
 Joseph C. Szabo, twelfth  Federal Railroad Administrator of the United States
 Alicia Tate-Nadeau, first Woman to be promoted as a general in the Illinois Army National Guard; the executive director of the Chicago Office of Emergency Management and Communications; Director of Homeland Security and the Illinois Emergency Management Agency (IEMA) under Illinois Governor J. B. Pritzker.
 Malachi Thompson, avant-garde jazz trumpet player
 Chastity Wells-Armstrong (born 1971/1972), first African-American to serve as mayor of Kankakee, Illinois
 Sheryl Underwood, comedian and actress
 William Kresse (Professor Fraud), subject matter expert

Notable faculty
 David Hamilton Golland, historian and author of the books A Terrible Thing to Waste and Constructing Affirmative Action
 Daniel Nearing, screenwriter and director of the films Chicago Heights and Hogtown

See also 
 Hosty v. Carter

References

External links 
 
 Official athletics website

 
State universities in Illinois
Public universities and colleges in Illinois
Educational institutions established in 1969
Two year upper class colleges
Education in Will County, Illinois
Buildings and structures in Will County, Illinois
1969 establishments in Illinois